The Palestinian exodus from Kuwait took place during and after the Gulf War. There were 400,000 Palestinians living in Kuwait before the state was invaded by neighbouring Iraq in August 1990. During the subsequent Iraqi military occupation of the country, some 200,000 Palestinians left due to various reasons such as fear of persecution, food and medical care shortages, financial difficulties, and fear of arrest or mistreatment at roadblocks by Iraqi troops. After Operation Desert Storm, which saw Iraqi forces defeated and pushed out of Kuwait by a United States-led coalition, another 200,000 Palestinians fled Kuwait, partly due to economic burdens, regulations on residence and fear of abuse by Kuwaiti security forces. The policy which partly led to this exodus was a response to the alignment of the Palestine Liberation Organization (PLO) in favour of the Iraqi invasion as well as PLO leader Yasser Arafat's support for Saddam Hussein, the then President of Iraq.

The Palestinians who fled Kuwait were mostly Jordanian citizens. By 2004, the political situation between the Palestinian leadership and Kuwait improved with the issuance of an official apology by Mahmoud Abbas for the PLO's support of the Iraqi occupation. In 2012, the official Palestinian embassy in Kuwait was re-opened, and some 80,000 Palestinians were living in the state.

Background
Before the Gulf War, Palestinians comprised 400,000 of Kuwait's total population, which was approximately 2 million people at the time.

Palestinian nationals arrived in Kuwait in three different phases: 1948 (First Arab–Israeli War and Nakba), 1967 (Third Arab–Israeli War) and 1973 (Fourth Arab–Israeli War).

Events

During Iraqi occupation

The massive exodus of Palestinians from Kuwait began with the Iraqi invasion into the country in summer 1990. The exodus included both Kuwaitis and Palestinians, who were forming a large percentage of Kuwaiti residents. Out of initial 350,000 people of Palestinian descent who resided in Kuwait in mid-1990, more than 200,000 fled Kuwait during the Iraqi occupation of Kuwait, due to harassment and intimidation by Iraqi security forces, in addition to getting fired from work by Iraqi authority figures in Kuwait. The Iraqi education ministry in Kuwait fired 3,000 Palestinians in September 1990, and the dismissals of Palestinians from other sectors continued throughout October. The Iraqis also put pressure on the PLO office in Kuwait, which had refused to organize any Palestinian demonstrations and rallies in support of Iraq.

March 1991 exodus
Kuwait's lack of support for Palestinians after the Gulf War was a response to the alignment of Palestinian leader Yasser Arafat and the PLO with Saddam Hussein, who had earlier invaded Kuwait. On March 14, 1991, 200,000 Palestinians were still residing in Kuwait, out of initial 400,000. Palestinians were forced to leave Kuwait during one week in March 1991, following Kuwait's liberation from Iraqi occupation. During a single week in March, the Palestinian population of Kuwait had almost entirely got deported out the country. Kuwaitis said that Palestinians leaving the country could move to Jordan, since most Palestinians held Jordanian passports. According to the New York Times, Kuwaitis said the anger against Palestinians was such that there was little chance that those who had left during the seven-month occupation could ever return and relatively few of those remaining will be able to stay.

Aftermath
The Palestinians who were expelled from Kuwait were generally Jordanian citizens. They were formally recognized as Jordanians of Palestinian origin.

In 2004, Kuwait allegedly put off a planned visit by Mahmoud Abbas, then the number-two PLO official after leader Yasser Arafat. Palestinian officials initially denied reports that this was due to the PLO's refusal to apologize over its support of the 1990 Iraqi invasion of Kuwait. However, on 12 December 2004, Abbas, now the leader of the PLO, apologized for the Palestinian leadership's support of Iraq and Saddam Hussein during the invasion and occupation. On the first visit to Kuwait by a top Palestinian official since the 1990 invasion, Abbas stated: "I say we yes, we apologize over our stand towards Kuwait."

In 2012, there were 80,000 Palestinians living in Kuwait.

See also
1948 Palestinian exodus
1991 uprisings in Iraq

Notes

Foreign relations of Kuwait
Gulf War
1991 in Kuwait
History of the Palestinian refugees
Kuwait
Forced migration
 
Palestinian diaspora in the Arab world
History of Kuwait